Mary MacCornack Forsythe (May 23, 1920 – September 6, 2007) was an American politician and music teacher.

Born in Whitehall, Wisconsin, Forsythe graduated from Whitehall High School and then received her bachelor's degree from St. Olaf College in music, where she sang in the St. Olaf Choir. She taught music in elementary and high school. Forsythe lived in Edina, Minnesota.

Forsythe served in the Minnesota House of Representatives from 1973 to 1991 as a Republican. For her entire term in office she served on the Appropriations Committee and chaired it from 1985 to 1986. She was the Assistant Minority Leader from 1981 to 1982. Among her accomplishments in office are improvements to women's prison facilities and programs and the mandatory seat belt law for which she was the chief House sponsor.

She died in Saint Paul, Minnesota.

Notes

1920 births
2007 deaths
People from Edina, Minnesota
People from Whitehall, Wisconsin
St. Olaf College alumni
Women state legislators in Minnesota
Republican Party members of the Minnesota House of Representatives
20th-century American politicians
20th-century American women politicians
21st-century American women